The pygmy bushtit (Aegithalos exilis) is a species of bird in the bushtit family Aegithalidae. The species was once placed, along with the rest of its family, with the true tits, Paridae.

It is endemic to Indonesia, where it occurs only on the island of Java. It frequents conifer forest and other open forest types, and is often encountered on the forest edge.

The pygmy bushtit is the smallest member of its family, and the smallest passerine.

The pygmy bushtit was formerly placed in its own monotypic genus Psaltria. It was moved to the current genus Aegithalos based on the results of a molecular phylogenetic study published in 2016.

References

pygmy bushtit
Birds of Java
pygmy bushtit
Taxonomy articles created by Polbot
Taxobox binomials not recognized by IUCN